CSCAE may refer to:

 California State Consortium for Adult Education
 Consejo Superior de los Colegios de Arquitectos de España, professional association of Spanish architects